Coloma (Nisenan: Cullumah, meaning "beautiful") is a census-designated place in El Dorado County, California, US. Coloma is most noted for being the site where James W. Marshall found gold in the Sierra Nevada foothills, at Sutter's Mill on January 24, 1848, leading to the California Gold Rush. Coloma's population is 529.

The settlement is a tourist attraction known for its ghost town and the centerpiece of the Marshall Gold Discovery State Historic Park.  Coloma was designated a National Historic Landmark District on July 4, 1961.

It lies at an elevation of 764 feet (233 m).

Etymology
The name comes from the Nisenan Indian name for the valley in which Coloma is located: Cullumah, meaning 'beautiful.' Coloma is on the South Fork American River that runs through the valley and was built on the original Indian village of Koloma. Former spellings include "Colluma" and "Culloma"..

History
Coloma grew around Sutter's Mill following the finding of gold. A post office was established in 1849 under the name Culloma, changing to Coloma in 1851.

One of Coloma's earliest settlers was Silas Sanderson (1824–1886), who went on to become the 7th Chief Justice of California. Another was Nancy Gooch, who was one of the first black women to succeed in California.

Ghost town

While some people still live in the area, Coloma is considered something of a ghost town because civic buildings such as the jail have been abandoned and left to decay, and other buildings from its boom era (1847–1852) have been converted into museums and other historical displays. The tailrace of Sutter's Mill remains, as does a nearby reconstruction.

In reality the meaningfulness of the township of Coloma has dissipated as residents who live in the wider Coloma Valley area generally share a community spirit.

The local economy is based predominantly on agriculture and tourism. Of particular note is the rafting industry as the South Fork American River is one of the most popular white-water trips in North America.

Demographics

The 2010 United States Census reported that Coloma had a population of 529. The racial makeup of Coloma was 462 (87.3%) White, 4 (0.8%) African American, 3 (0.6%) Native American, 8 (1.5%) Asian, 0 (0.0%) Pacific Islander, 15 (2.8%) from other races, and 37 (7.0%) from two or more races. Hispanic or Latino of any race were 63 people (11.9%).

The Census reported that 429 people (93.6% of the population) lived in households, 34 (6.4%) lived in non-institutionalized group quarters, and 0 (0%) were institutionalized.

There were 216 households, out of which 44 (20.4%) had children under the age of 18 living in them, 116 (53.7%) were opposite-sex married couples living together, 14 (6.5%) had a female householder with no husband present, 10 (4.6%) had a male householder with no wife present. There were 22 (10.2%) unmarried opposite-sex partnerships, and 2 (0.9%) same-sex married couples or partnerships. 51 households (23.6%) were made up of individuals, and 20 (9.3%) had someone living alone. The average household size was 2.29. There were 140 families (64.8% of all households); the average family size was 2.64.

The population was spread out, with 69 people (13.0%) under the age of 18, 31 people (5.9%) aged 18 to 24, 127 people (24.0%) aged 25 to 44, 200 people (37.8%) aged 45 to 64, and 102 people (19.3%) who were 65 years of age or older. The median age was 49.0 years. For every 100 females, there were 115.9 males. For every 100 females age 18 and over, there were 120.1 males.

The homeowner vacancy rate was 1.3%; the rental vacancy rate was 12.5%. 355 people (67.1% of the population) lived in owner-occupied housing units, and 140 people (26.5%) lived in rental housing units.

Politics

Climate
According to the Köppen Climate Classification system, Coloma has a warm-summer Mediterranean climate, abbreviated "Csa" on climate maps.

Sister cities
Clunes, Australia

Notable people
 Nancy Gooch

References

External links

Local visitor's guide

California Gold Rush
Census-designated places in El Dorado County, California
Ghost towns in California
Mining communities of the California Gold Rush
Historic districts on the National Register of Historic Places in California
National Historic Landmarks in California
National Register of Historic Places in El Dorado County, California
Former county seats in California
Historic American Buildings Survey in California
Populated places established in 1849
1849 establishments in California
Census-designated places in California
Populated places on the National Register of Historic Places in California